Roque Vallejos (Asunción 1943 - Asunción, 2 April 2006) was a poet, psychiatrist and essayist from Paraguay.

Background

He was a forensic surgeon in the High Court of Justice.

He served as a member and the president of the Academia de la Lengua Paraguaya.

Career as a writer

He belonged to the so-called 60 generation. This group was concerned with social poetry and politics during Alfredo Stroessner's dictatorship (1954-1989).

Works

Los arcángeles ebrios (The Drunk Archangels), (1964)
Poemas del Apocalipsis (Poems from Apocalypse), (1969)
Los labios del silencio (Silence Lips), (1986)
Tiempo baldío (Vain Time), (1988)

External links
Roque Vallejos on MundoPoesía (in Spanish)

20th-century Paraguayan poets
Paraguayan male poets
1943 births
2006 deaths
Paraguayan essayists
Male essayists
Paraguayan psychiatrists
20th-century essayists
20th-century male writers